Telephone numbers in Mexico are regulated by the Federal Telecommunications Institute, an independent government agency of Mexico. The agency published the Fundamental Technical Plan for Numbering (Plan Técnico Fundamental de Numeración) on May 11, 2018. The plan establishes a uniform ten-digit telephone number format. It took effect on August 3, 2019.

Telephone number format
All telephone numbers in Mexico have ten digits, of which the first identifies eight principal geographic region of the country.

The national number was formed by prefixing the previously existing local number format with an area code. All ten digits must be dialed, even for local calls.

Dialing prefixes 
Since August 3, 2019, only the following dialing prefixes are available for use within Mexico:

Dialing into Mexico 
Destinations in Mexico are dialed from foreign location by dialing the foreign country's International access code (011 in the US, 00 in many other countries), the country code 52, and the ten-digit national telephone number of the destination.

History
Until August 3, 2019, telephone numbers in Mexico consisted of ten digits with either two-digit area codes (for Mexico City, Monterrey, and Guadalajara and their respective metropolitan areas) or three-digit area codes for the rest of the country. New area codes were assigned in the overlay format to address number exhaustion: in 2017, Toluca and Puebla and in 2018, Leon, Mexico City, and Tijuana.

In the early development of International Direct Distance Dialing (IDDD), Mexico elected to join World Zone 5, instead of joining the North American Numbering Plan (NANP). Since the 1960s, the Bell System had already established technical infrastructure to include Mexico in the NANP routing system, and continued to maintain special dialing arrangement using NANP area codes 903 (northwest Mexico) and 905 (Mexico City) from the US into Mexico, because of high community interest into the 1980s. The area codes were withdrawn for this use by c. 1990, requiring callers to dial the international access codes.

Area codes
Major cities and metropolitan areas have the following codes:

Dialing prefixes prior to 2019

Other service numbers

See also
Area codes in Mexico by code

References

External links 
ITU allocations list

 
Mexico
Telephone numbers
Telephone numbers